Abdul Karim was a Member of Parliament of Pakistan representing East Bengal.

Career
Karim was elected to parliament from East Pakistan as a Muslim candidate.

References

Pakistani MNAs 1955–1958